Dave Szulborski (June 23, 1957 – April 23, 2009) was the first professional independent alternate reality game developer, and an authority on ARGs. His books on the subject are used today in curricula on alternate reality games and transmedia storytelling.  His independent games included ChangeAgents, Chasing the Wish, and Urban Hunt. He holds the Guinness World Record for Most Prolific ARG developer.

Biography
Szulborski started his transmedia career as a beta tester for Majestic, an early attempt at pervasive gaming from Electronic Arts. He spun off his first games, called ChangeAgents, in that universe. One of the first independent ARG developers, Szulborski became well known for his work on indie games Chasing the Wish and Urban Hunt. He wrote This Is Not a Game, the first book on alternate reality games, and launched a career into professional ARG design with his contributions to Art of the Heist.

Later in his career, he created ARGs, puzzles, and stories for projects as varied as marketing campaigns and military training exercises. He was also a public speaker and contributing author on the topic of interactive storytelling.

Szulborski died in April 2009 of leukemia. Before his death, his battle with the illness prompted friends and fans of his work to create Folding the Wish, a project to send him a thousand origami cranes.

Dave has a son, Tyler David Szulboski.

In 2012, Szulborski was posthumously awarded the Guinness World Record for Most Prolific ARG Developer.

Bibliography

Alternate reality games
 2001: Majestic – beta tester, content creator through BIOS program – Electronic Arts
 2001: ChangeAgents – Creative Chip - independent
 2001: ChangeAgents – Operation Mindset - independent, done as part of Majestic's BIOS Program and featured on their website and in their newsletter
 2002: ChangeAgents – Out of Control - independent
 2003: Chasing the Wish – independent
 2004: Urban Hunt (Dread House) - independent
 2005: ARGTalk - independent
 2005: Art of the Heist – for Audi, McKinney-Silver, Chelsea Digital, GMD Studios
 2006: Who is Benjamin Stove? – for General Motors, Campbell-Ewald, GMD Studios
 2006: Catching the Wish – independent
 2007: Unnatural Selection (Monster Hunter Club) – for The Host movie, ARGStudios, Magnolia Pictures
 2007: Helical Training program - an ARG based training program for BBN Technologies and the U.S. military (DARPA and JFCOM)
 2008: Holomove – for Microsoft Visual Studio
 2008: McCann Erickson, @radicalmedia

Books
 2005: Author, This Is Not a Game: A Guide to Alternate Reality Gaming
 2006: Author, Through the Rabbit Hole: A Beginner’s Guide to Playing Alternate Reality Games
 2006: Creator, Chasing The Wish (comic)
 2007: Contributor, Space, Time, Play
 2008: Contributor, Digital Storytelling: A Creator's Guide to Interactive Entertainment, Volume 2 and Branding Only Works on Cattle

Television work
 2006: Danger Game TV Show pilot with Superfine Films (NYC)

Non-ARG marketing campaigns and online games
 2006: Hedgegames – for HP and DreamWorks for Over the Hedge film – Campfire Media
 2006: Santa Barbara International Film Festival Podcasting official website design
 2006: The Missing Gnome interactive components for Travelocity – McKinney-Silver
 2007: Fairy Tale Ransom – M&M’S and DreamWorks for Shrek the Third – G2 Interactive
 2007: Rise of the Chevy Autobots – Chevrolet, DreamWorks, and Paramount for the 2007 Transformers movie - Campbell-Ewald
 2007: The President's Book Blog – Disney for the 2007 film National Treasure 2: Book of Secrets
 2008: Starburst Brand And Skittles Brand "Summer Fever Search Party" – for G2 Interactive and Skittles
 2008: Vroengard Academy – Random House and Deep Focus for the 2008 book release Brisingr
 2008: Red Seal puzzle – HBO and Campfire for the HBO TV series True Blood
 2008: No Known Survivors – Electronic Arts and Deep Focus for the 2008 video game Dead Space

References

External links
The World According to Dave Szulborski

T580: Interactive Storytelling and Game Design
Folding the Wish
A collection of Dave's articles at Alterati.com

Citations

1957 births
2009 deaths
Video game designers
Deaths from leukemia
Place of birth missing